Cervical cancer staging is the assessment of cervical cancer to decide how far the disease has progressed. This is important for determining disease prognosis and treatment. Cancer staging generally runs from stage 0, which is pre-cancerous or non-invasive, to stage IV, in which the cancer has spread throughout a significant part of the body.

Cervical cancer is staged by the International Federation of Gynecology and Obstetrics (FIGO) staging system. Prior to the 2018 update, FIGO staging of cervical cancer allowed only the following diagnostic tests to be used in determining the stage: palpation (feeling with the fingers), inspection, colposcopy, endocervical curettage, hysteroscopy, cystoscopy, proctoscopy, intravenous urography, and X-ray examination of the lungs and skeleton, and cervical conization. But with the 2018 update of FIGO staging of cervical cancer, imaging and pathology were added as allowable methods to assess disease stage.

Overview of staging 
FIGO guidelines suggest that lower staging should be assigned whenever possible. Staging is determined after all imaging and pathology reports have been collected and interpreted. The stage of cervical cancer cannot be altered at recurrence.

Imaging 
The use of imaging can provide more information regarding prognosis, which informs treatment. The goal of staging is to identify the most appropriate treatment method and to minimize dual therapy, which can significantly impact morbidity. The imaging modality used for diagnosis should always be noted. Imaging modalities include ultrasound, MRI, CT, and positron emission tomography (PET).

For primary tumors over 10 mm, MRI is the best method of radiologic assessment. For nodal metastasis over 10 mm, PET-CT is the most accurate modality for diagnosis, as this can differentiate large lymph nodes that are not metastatic (for example, those that are enlarged due to inflammation or infection) from lymph nodes that are enlarged due to metastases. The diagnosis of nodal metastasis can be supplemented with surgical assessment via minimally invasive surgery or laparotomy to collect a biopsy or perform a fine needle aspiration.

Pathology 
As with imaging, pathologic methods used for diagnosis should always be noted for future evaluation. All cancers must be confirmed by microscopic examination.

There are 10 histopathologic types of cervical cancers:

 Squamous cell carcinoma (keratinizing; non-keratinizing; papillary, basaloid, warty, verrucous, squamotransitional, lymphoepithelioma-like)
 Adenocarcinoma (endocervical; mucinous, villoglandular, endometrioid)
 Clear cell adenocarcinoma
 Serous carcinoma
 Adenosquamous carcinoma
 Glassy cell carcinoma
 Adenoid cystic carcinoma
 Adenoid basal carcinoma
 Small cell carcinoma
 Undifferentiated carcinoma

Cancers can be histopathologically graded as follows:

 GX: Grade cannot be assessed
 G1: Well differentiated
 G2: Moderately differentiated
 G3: Poorly or undifferentiated

Sample collection 
For microinvasive disease, clinicians should collect a specimen using a loop electrosurgical excision procedure (LEEP) or a cone biopsy. If a patient has a visible lesion, a punch biopsy may be attempted. If the specimen is not satisfactory, a small loop biopsy or cone may be required.

Stages

Stage 0 
 The carcinoma is confined to the surface layer (cells lining) of the cervix. Also called carcinoma in situ (CIS).

Stage I 
 The carcinoma has grown into the cervix, but has not spread beyond it (extension to the corpus would be disregarded).  Stage One is subdivided as follows:
IA: Invasive carcinoma which can be diagnosed only by microscopy on a LEEP or cone biopsy specimen, or on a trachelectomy or hysterectomy specimen, with deepest invasion <5 mm from the base of the epithelium. It can originate from squamous or glandular epithelium. The margins of the specimen should be reported to be negative for disease. Lymphovascular involvement must be noted to inform the treatment plan, although it does not change stage designation.
 IA1: Measured stromal invasion <3.0 mm
 IA2: Measured stromal invasion ≥3.0 mm and <5 mm

IB:  Invasive carcinoma with measured deepest invasion ≥5 mm, limited to the cervix. The lesions are clinically visible, which differentiates IB from IA. If the margins of the cone biopsy are positive for invasive disease, Stage IB1 is automatically assigned. As with Stage IA, the involvement of vascular or lymphatic spaces does not change the staging, but should be noted to inform the treatment plan.
 IB1: Invasive carcinoma ≥5 mm depth of invasion and <2 cm in greatest dimension
 IB2: Invasive carcinoma ≥2 cm and <4 cm in greatest dimension
IB3: Invasive carcinoma ≥4.0 cm in greatest dimension

Stage II 
Cervical carcinoma invades beyond the uterus, but not to the pelvic wall or to the lower third of the vagina
IIA: Without parametrial invasion
 IIA1: Tumor <4.0 cm in greatest dimension
 IIA2: Tumor ≥4.0 cm in greatest dimension
IIB: With parametrial invasion

Stage III 
The carcinoma involves the lower third of the vagina and/or extends to the pelvic wall and/or causes hydronephrosis or non‐functioning kidney and/or involves pelvic and/or para-aortic lymph nodes.
IIIA: Carcinoma involves the lower third of the vagina, with no extension to the pelvic wall.IIIB: Extension to the pelvic wall and/or hydronephrosis or non‐functioning kidney.
IIIC: Involvement of pelvic and/or para-aortic lymph nodes, irrespective of tumor size and extent
IIIC1: Pelvic lymph node metastasis only
IIIC2: Para‐aortic lymph node metastasis

Stage IV 
The carcinoma has extended beyond the true pelvis or has involved (biopsy proven) the mucosa of the bladder or rectum.  A bullous edema, as such, does not permit a case to be allotted to Stage IV
IVA: Spread of the growth to adjacent organs
IVB: Spread to distant organs

History of cervical cancer staging 
The drive to develop a staging for gynecological malignancies, including cancer of the cervix, was the need to have a uniform method to describe the extent of the disease. Comparing outcomes from different treatments could only be possible if the comparison were made for groups of patients with a similar degree of disease burden.

Major Historical Timepoints 
1929 - League of Nations Classification for Cervical Cancer

1937 - First annual report of statistics on radiotherapy outcomes in cervical cancer patients

1938 - Atlas of Cervical Cancer Staging (Heyman and Strandquist)

1950 - The International Classification of the Stages of Carcinoma of the Uterine Cervix

1954 - Founding of FIGO

1958 - FIGO becomes the official publisher of the Annual Report

1973 - Commencement of triennial publication of the Annual Report on the Results of Treatment in Gynecological Cancer

1976 - The American Joint Committee on Cancer accepts the FIGO stage grouping for gynecological cancers

2018 - Latest triennial FIGO Cancer Report

The most recent updates to cervical cancer staging included in the 2018 edition marked a departure from a system based mainly on clinical evaluation to one that allows imaging and pathological methods to help determine tumor size and extent of disease to assign the stage. A major topic of debate was the impact that newer diagnostic modalities would have on low- and middle-income countries, which bear most of the disease burden. The final recommendations make findings from imaging and pathology optional for staging rather than a requirement.

References

Oncology
Infectious causes of cancer